is a Japanese four-panel manga series by Mitsuki. It has been serialized since August 2014 in Media Factory's seinen manga magazine Comic Cune, which was originally a magazine supplement in the seinen manga magazine Monthly Comic Alive until August 2015. Seven tankōbon volumes of the manga were released between August 27, 2015 and March 27, 2021. Hinako Note is also available on Kadokawa Corporation's ComicWalker website. An anime television series adaptation by Passione aired in Japan between April and June 2017.

Plot
Having always had an interest in theater but struggling to talk with others, Hinako Sakuragi moves to Tokyo to attend Fujiyama High School, staying as a resident at the Hitotose book store. Upon learning that the school's theater club is actually on hiatus, Hinako and the other residents form their own theater troupe.

Characters

A first year high school girl who moves to Tokyo in the hopes of joining a theater club. She is friendly with animals but struggles with talking to other people, often winding up in a scarecrow-like pose.

Kuina is a first year high school girl who works at the Hitotose book store. She has a heavy appetite and will occasionally eat pages from the store's books.

Mayuki is a second year high school girl who works in Hitotose's coffee shop, often dressed in maid attire. Despite being older than Hinako and Kuina, she often acts like an elementary school student.

Chiaki is a second year high school girl who is a member of the currently-on-hiatus theater club and landlady of Hitotose Manor. 

Yua is Hinako's classmate who strongly loves Chiaki and often has a one-sided rivalry with Hinako.

Ruriko is a nine-year-old child actress and the advisor of the theater club.

Media

Manga
Hinako Note is a four-panel manga series by Mitsuki, a Japanese manga artist who mainly draws adult comics. It began serialization in Comic Cune'''s October 2014 issue released on August 27, 2014; At first, Comic Cune was a "magazine within a magazine" placed in Monthly Comic Alive, later it became independent of Comic Alive and changed to a formal magazine on August 27, 2015. Hinako Note is also available on Kadokawa Corporation's ComicWalker website. Seven tankōbon volumes of the manga were released between August 27, 2015 and March 27, 2021. The series ended on January 27, 2021.

Anime
An anime television series adaptation by Passione was announced. The series is directed by Toru Kitahata, with Takeo Takahashi credited as chief director. A key visual was unveiled on March 21, 2017. The anime aired in Japan between April 7 and June 23, 2017 and was simulcast by Crunchyroll. The series ran for 12 episodes.

Reception
Previews
Anime News Network had five editors review the first episode of the anime: Rebecca Silverman was critical of Hinako's scarecrow act feeling false when socializing with people but was intrigued by where it will go in later episodes when the theatre stuff begins; Lynzee Loveridge noted how the production focused on its cast delivering harmless cute antics found in similar anime, crediting the decent chemistry but found it lacking in both comedy and dramatic development, saying it will fulfill its given niche and garner a small following that bought merch related to it; Nick Creamer was generally unimpressed by the adaptation's "rote basics" of the subgenre it occupies, highlighting the overused jokes and middling atmosphere that encompassed the episode, calling it "a passable effort for genre enthusiasts" but nothing more; Paul Jensen also noticed the usual slice-of-life trappings throughout the episode, pointing out the vibrant animation and "mildly amusing" cast of adorable female characters but felt it was missing a "spark of creativity" to put it above the other all-girl comedy shows that came out in previous seasons, saying its "merely competent on a basic level." The fifth reviewer, Theron Martin, saw potential in the series with its main heroine Hinako overcoming her social anxiety through theatre and also gave praise to both studio Passione and director Takeo Takahashi for making a "creative departure" from their comfort zone to create an opener with solid delivery in both its aesthetic and humor, concluding that: "I probably won't watch any more, as this series isn't my kind of thing, but it looks quite promising for those who do like such fare."

Series reception
Stig Høgset, writing for THEM Anime Reviews, commended the "generally fine" animation for making the character designs "downright adorable" when being adorn with various dress styles but was critical of the lazy humor delivered by the cast, lack of focus on acting, and the leering fanservice interrupting the show's overall moe vibe, calling it: "Visually pleasing, and funny maybe once or twice per episode, but otherwise dry, uninteresting and underwhelming."

Notes

References

External links
  
 Anime official website 
 Hinako Note at ComicWalker'' 
 

2017 anime television series debuts
Anime series based on manga
Crunchyroll anime
Kadokawa Dwango franchises
Manga adapted into television series
Media Factory manga
Passione (company)
Seinen manga
Yonkoma